The Headmaster is a British comedy play by Edward Knoblock and Wilfred Coleby which was first staged in 1913. A farce, it involves a clergyman working as the headmaster of a school who tries to persuade his daughter to marry the idiotic son of an influential figure in the hope of being promoted to bishop.

Adaptation
In 1921 the play was turned into a silent film The Headmaster directed by Kenelm Foss.

References

Bibliography
 Low, Rachael. History of the British Film, 1918-1929. George Allen & Unwin, 1971.

1913 plays
British plays adapted into films
Plays set in England